David Michel Wiener (New York City, January 1958) is an American artist and serial entrepreneur.

Biography 
David Michel Wiener is an American artist and serial entrepreneur. His father, Sam Wiener, is also an artist, and his grandfather Samuel G. Wiener was an architect featured in the documentary “Unexpected Modernism” and an artist (painter). David worked as an apprentice to George Silk to become one of the youngest professional photographers shooting Formula One, Indianapolis 500, America’s Cup, and US Open Events during his teenage years.
David was represented at that time by Focus On Sports, A New York City-based agency. Before graduating from Hampshire College, he was the subject of a PBS documentary, “Human Power”, featuring the vehicles he designed and built for the Human Power World Speed Championship in 1981. When he was at college, he invented a low-slung three-wheel bicycle that could go 60 miles an hour.
For David, art represents many things such as aesthetics, self-expression, and something to share. His creative and entrepreneurial work has crossed diverse industries such as fashion for sportswear, avant-garde furniture, custom Porsches, manufacturing and designing audio speakers for important brands such as Ferrari.
In recent years, David has turned his creative attention to produce artwork. He channeled his photography as the source medium to create modern abstract pieces with specific subject matter that brings the detail of life into critical focus.

Exhibitions 
 OpenArtCode Salone di Donatello, San Lorenzo church, Florence, Italy -2018
 GemlucArt – Monaco, Monte Carlo - 2017 
 AJAC exhibition, Tokyo Metropolitan Art Museum, Japan - 2017 
 ArtExpo New York – Pier 94, New York City - 2017 
 Art.Engine, Ferrari SpA, Maranello, Italy - 2009

References 

1958 births
20th-century American artists
20th-century American male artists
Artists from New York City
Living people